Matilda Mossman (born August 7, 1956) is an American college basketball coach and the former head coach of the Tulsa women's basketball team.

Head coaching record
Source

References

External links
Tulsa Golden Hurricane coaching bio

Living people
American women's basketball coaches
Arkansas Razorbacks women's basketball coaches
High school basketball coaches in the United States
Illinois State Redbirds women's basketball coaches
Kansas State Wildcats women's basketball coaches
Tulsa Golden Hurricane women's basketball coaches
Western Kentucky University alumni
Place of birth missing (living people)
1956 births